Oberer Wehrbach is of small river in the Englischer Garten, a public park in Munich, Bavaria, Germany. It branches off the Schwabinger Bach and flows into the Oberstjägermeisterbach.

See also
List of rivers of Bavaria

References

Rivers of Bavaria
Rivers of Germany